Octavia E. Butler Landing is the February 18, 2021, landing site of the Mars 2020 Perseverance rover within Jezero crater on planet Mars. On March 5, 2021, NASA named the site for the renowned American science fiction author, Octavia E. Butler, who died on February 24, 2006. The Mars landing took place nearly 15 years to the day after her death. The coordinates of the landing site on Mars are

Description 

Jezero Crater was chosen as the 2021 landing site for the Perseverance rover and Ingenuity helicopter as part of the Mars 2020 mission. Thought to have once been flooded with water, the crater contains a fan-delta deposit rich in clays. The lake in the crater was present when valley networks were forming on Mars. Besides having a delta, the crater shows point bars and inverted channels. From a study of the delta and channels, it was concluded that the lake inside the crater probably formed during a period in which there was continual surface runoff. Since it is believed that the lake was long-lived, life may have developed in the crater; the delta may have required a period of one to ten million years to form.

Octavia E. Butler 
Octavia Estelle Butler (June 22, 1947 – February 24, 2006) was an African American science fiction author who published a number of novel series between 1976 and 1998. A multiple recipient of both the Hugo and Nebula awards, in 1995 she became the first science-fiction writer to receive a MacArthur Fellowship.

Butler published standalone novels, short stories, essays and speeches. She was born in and grew up in Pasadena, California, the location of NASA's Jet Propulsion Laboratory, which manages the Perseverance rover project.

Gallery

See also 

 Bradbury Landing
 List of extraterrestrial memorials
 Perseverance rover landing site
 Timeline of Mars 2020
 Women in speculative fiction

Notes

References

External links 

 Mars 2020 and Perseverance rover official site at NASA
 
 

American science fiction writers
Mars 2020
2021 on Mars